Mitra is an Indo-Iranian deity.

Mitra or Mithra may also refer to:

Indo-Iranian deities
 Mithra (Persian: Mitra), a Zoroastrian yazata
 Mitra (Vedic), a deity (asura) who appears frequently in the ancient Indian text of the Rigveda
 Mitra–Varuna, dual deities in the Rigveda

Biology
 Mitra (gastropod), a genus of Neogastropod snail named for the episcopal mitre
 Mitra mitra, the episcopal miter
 Acmaea mitra, the whitecap limpet
 Seychelles crow (Euploea mitra), a nymphalid butterfly

People
 Mitra (surname)
 Mitra (given name)

Places
 La Mitra, a town in the Panamá province of Panama
 Cerro de las Mitras ("Miter Hill" or "Miter Mountain"), a mountain in Nuevo León, Mexico
 Colonias Mitras Centro, Mitras Norte and Mitras Sur, neighborhoods in Monterrey, Nuevo León, Mexico
 Mitras (Monterrey Metro) (aka Estación Mitras), a station on the Line 1 of the Monterrey Metro

Other uses
 Mitra (Conan), a deity in Robert E. Howard's Hyborian Age stories
 Mitra (crater), a crater on the Moon named for Sisir Kumar Mitra
 MITRA Youth Buddhist Network, a network of youth Buddhist organizations in Australia
 Operazione Mitra, a 1951 Italian film
 PS Mitra Kukar, an Indonesian football club
 Volkswagen Mitra, another name for the Volkswagen EA489 Basistransporter
 Mitra (film), a 2021 Dutch film

See also 
 MITRA (disambiguation)
 Mitra dynasty (disambiguation)
 Mithras (disambiguation)
 Mitre (disambiguation)